Jurassic 5 is the first official release by American hip hop group Jurassic 5. It is an EP that includes much of the material that would later appear on the full-length album Jurassic 5.

Release
The first version of the EP to be released contained nine tracks and was available in CD single or double-12" single formats. It was released in October 1997 on the band's own short-lived label, Rumble Records.

Although the label only released one record, it did give the band a platform and allowed them to be heard.

"I urge every independent artist to put something out first. Prove yourself to yourself, to people that pick up the records, then the [labels] will come looking for you. If they know that you can score, they gonna pass the ball to you." — Akil

The band signed to a major label, Interscope Records, in 1999. Their first release on Interscope was the re-issue of the Jurassic 5 EP in an 8-track version in 1999. This had the same listing as the original EP, excluding the final track "Blacktop Beat".

Track listing

References

External links 
 

1997 debut EPs
Jurassic 5 albums
Interscope Records EPs